Karole Kasita is a Ugandan musician,singer and song writter. She was born in central Uganda on April 25th 1989.  

She is not very loud about her love life and relationships so it remains a mystery to the public.

She went to Gayaza Junior School.

She attended St Josephs College Nagalama for her O'level and later joined Kibibi high school for A'level before joining Makerere University Business School in Nakawa where she attained a bachors of Science in entrpreneurship.

Career 
Her career is dated way back in highschool where she would write her own songs and sing them to her classmates and friends. she decided to turn her passion for music into a career after she left Makerere University. she first made her song 'bounce it' which was a collabo with Nutty Neithan in 2016. she has further written more music like 'binyuma','baby papa'.

References